Aurora Miraflores is a Peruvian football club, playing in the city of Lima, Peru.

The club were founded 1958 and play in the Copa Perú which is the third division of the Peruvian league.

History
Founded in 1958 by Ernesto Roth and his brother Luis Roth. The club have played at the second level of Peruvian football on four occasions, from 1988 until 1991 when was relegated.

In 2002, the club fused with the Olímpico Somos Perú, and participated in the Segunda Division Peruana as Olímpico Aurora Miraflores.

Honours

Regional
Liga Mayor de Fútbol de Lima:
Runner-up (1): 1979

Liga Provincial de Lima:
Winners (1): 1975

Liga Distrital de Miraflores:
Winners (1): 2001

See also
List of football clubs in Peru
Peruvian football league system

External links
 Sin Paradero:Por un nuevo despertar

Football clubs in Peru
Association football clubs established in 1958
1958 establishments in Peru